EITC may refer to:

Earned Income Tax Credit
East India Trading Company
Educational Improvement Tax Credit, a Pennsylvania school choice legislative initiative
Emirates Integrated Telecommunications Company, or 'du' is a telecommunications company in the United Arab Emirates
European Information Technologies Certification, an international ICT qualifications certification standard